Petr Mikolanda (born 12 September 1984) is a former football player and currently a manager from the Czech Republic.

Career
Mikolanda scored his first competitive goal for Žižkov on 14 August 2003 in the 3–0 UEFA Cup victory over Zhenis Astana. He subsequently joined West Ham in July 2005 having scored 13 goals in the Czech second division in the 2004–05 season for Viktoria Žižkov. He joined Football League Two side Northampton Town on loan in September 2005, where he made three league and cup appearances. His loan spell at Northampton was cut short by injury but after recovering, he joined Swindon Town on loan in November 2005, for whom he made one start and four substitute appearances. He then joined Rushden and Diamonds on loan for the rest of the season in January 2006, and made nine appearances for Rushden, scoring a goal against Notts County with a half-volley from 30 yards. Mikolanda was released by West Ham manager Alan Pardew in May 2006, and joined FK Mladá Boleslav on a free transfer.

In 2007, he was diagnosed with inflammation of the kidney and was forced to stop his career. He then coached the youth team at Viktoria Žižkov whilst waiting for a kidney transplantation.

In July 2010, Mikolanda announced his comeback to professional football after three years of surgery, signing a new contract with FK Viktoria Žižkov. "The doctors stated that I'll be able to play again. I was waiting for this moment for three years and I never gave up, although many people thought that I had no chance. Now I'm ready and I can't wait to play again," he said.

On 12 January 2011, Mikolanda underwent a kidney transplantation to eliminate the risk of injury. Mikolanda followed this with assistant trainer positions at both Viktoria Žižkov and Slavia Praha before taking up his present manager position in June 2018.

References

External links
 
 
 
 
 Petr Mikolanda 2005–06 stats at SoccerFactsUK
 

1984 births
Living people
Czech footballers
Czech Republic youth international footballers
Czech Republic under-21 international footballers
Czech football managers
Association football forwards
Czech First League players
FK Viktoria Žižkov players
FK Mladá Boleslav players
West Ham United F.C. players
Northampton Town F.C. players
Swindon Town F.C. players
Rushden & Diamonds F.C. players
Czech expatriate footballers
Footballers from Prague
FC Silon Táborsko managers
FK Viktoria Žižkov managers
Czech National Football League managers